Neil McDonald (born 21 January 1967) is an English chess grandmaster and chess writer.

Chess career
As an English Chess Federation coach he has trained many of the country's strongest junior players and was Head Coach of the English Chess Federation team at the Greece World Schools Championship in 2013. 
He regularly escorts blind and partially sighted chess players to international World Championship events.

McDonald authored the French Defence monthly updates on chesspublishing.com from October 1999 until March 2009, 1 e4 ... updates from November 2009 until January 2010, 1 e4 ... from June 2014 until February 2015 and returned to 1 e4 ... in March 2017 until January 2018.

He became an International Master in 1986 and was awarded the Grandmaster title in 1996.

McDonald obtained his FIDE Trainer qualification in 2016.

Bibliography

References

External links

1967 births
Living people
People educated at Gravesend Grammar School
British chess writers
Chess grandmasters
Chess coaches
English chess players
English writers